is a Japanese footballer currently playing as a midfielder for YSCC Yokohama.

Career statistics

Club
.

Notes

References

External links

1996 births
Living people
People from Yamato, Kanagawa
Association football people from Kanagawa Prefecture
Japanese footballers
Association football midfielders
J3 League players
FC Machida Zelvia players
YSCC Yokohama players